Ulla Lindkvist (30 August 1939 – 6 August 2015) was a Swedish orienteering competitor, and the first individual female world champion in this sport. She won the 1966 and 1968 Individual World Orienteering Championships, and finished second 1970. She became Relay World Champion in 1970 as a member of the Swedish team (together with Birgitta Larsson and Eivor Steen-Olsson). She also participated on the teams that obtained silver medals in 1968 and 1972.

References

1939 births
2015 deaths
Swedish orienteers
Female orienteers
Foot orienteers
World Orienteering Championships medalists